Netechma caesiata is a species of moth of the family Tortricidae. It is found in Venezuela.

The wingspan is 10–12 mm. The ground colour of the forewings is buff, the basal two-fifths clouded with clay. The hindwings are ocherous white basally, followed by a greyish fuscous band. The subterminal and apical areas are light tawny.

References

Moths described in 1968
Netechma